In mathematics, the arithmetic–geometric mean of two positive real numbers  and  is the mutual limit of a sequence of arithmetic means and a sequence of geometric means:

Begin the sequences with x and y:

The arithmetic–geometric mean is used in fast algorithms for exponential and trigonometric functions, as well as some mathematical constants, in particular, computing .

The arithmetic–geometric mean can be extended to complex numbers and when the branches of the square root are allowed to be taken inconsistently, it is, in general, a multivalued function.

Example

The first five iterations give the following values:

History 
The first algorithm based on this sequence pair appeared in the works of Lagrange. Its properties were further analyzed by Gauss.

Properties
The geometric mean of two positive numbers is never bigger than the arithmetic mean (see inequality of arithmetic and geometric means). These are strict inequalities if .

If , then .

There is an integral-form expression for :

where  is the complete elliptic integral of the first kind:

Indeed, since the arithmetic–geometric process converges so quickly, it provides an efficient way to compute elliptic integrals via this formula. In engineering, it is used for instance in elliptic filter design.

The arithmetic–geometric mean is connected to the Jacobi theta function  by

which upon setting  gives

Related concepts 
The reciprocal of the arithmetic–geometric mean of 1 and the square root of 2 is called Gauss's constant, after Carl Friedrich Gauss.

In 1799, Gauss proved that

where  is the lemniscate constant.

In 1941,  (and hence ) was proven transcendental by Theodor Schneider. In fact,

The geometric–harmonic mean can be calculated by an analogous method, using sequences of geometric and harmonic means. One finds that .
The arithmetic–harmonic mean can be similarly defined, but takes the same value as the geometric mean (see section "Calculation" there).

The arithmetic–geometric mean can be used to compute – among others – logarithms,  complete and incomplete elliptic integrals of the first and second kind, and Jacobi elliptic functions.

Proof of existence
From the inequality of arithmetic and geometric means we can conclude that:

and thus

that is, the sequence  is nondecreasing.

Thus, by the monotone convergence theorem, the sequence is convergent, so there exists a  such that:

However, we can also see that:

and so:

Q.E.D.

Proof of the integral-form expression
This proof is given by Gauss.
Let

gives

Thus, we have

The last equality comes from observing that .

Finally, we obtain the desired result

Applications

The number π
For example, according to the Gauss–Legendre algorithm:

where

Complete elliptic integral K(sinα)
Taking  and  yields the AGM

where  is a complete elliptic integral of the first kind:

That is to say that this quarter period may be efficiently computed through the AGM,

Other applications
Using this property of the AGM along with the ascending transformations of John Landen, Richard P. Brent suggested the first AGM algorithms for the fast evaluation of elementary transcendental functions. Subsequently, many authors went on to study the use of the AGM algorithms.

See also
 Landen's transformation
 Gauss–Legendre algorithm
 Generalized mean

References

Notes

Citations

Sources

 
 
 

Means
Special functions
Elliptic functions
Articles containing proofs